Peter Berkowitz (born 1959) is an American political scientist, former law professor, and United States Department of State employee, most recently serving as the Director of Policy Planning at the United States Department of State. He currently serves as the Tad and Dianne Taube Senior Fellow at the Hoover Institution of Stanford University.

Education 
Berkowitz earned a B.A. in English literature from Swarthmore College in 1981, followed by an M.A. in philosophy from the Hebrew University of Jerusalem. He then earned a Ph.D. in political science from the Yale University Graduate School of Arts and Science and later a J.D. from Yale Law School.

Career 
Berkowitz taught constitutional law and jurisprudence at the Antonin Scalia Law School from 1999 to 2007, and political philosophy in the Department of Government at Harvard University from 1990 to 1999.

In 1997, after Harvard University president Neil Rudenstine rejected the Department of Government's recommendation and denied his tenure, Berkowitz challenged the process by which Rudenstine reached his decision through Harvard's internal grievance procedure. Eventually, in 2000, he brought a lawsuit for breach of contract against Harvard alleging flaws in both the tenure review process and the grievance procedure. In 2003, the Massachusetts Supreme Judicial Court dismissed his case.

He is co-founder and director of the Israel Program on Constitutional Government and is a member of the Policy Advisory Board at the Ethics and Public Policy Center. He sits on the board of directors of the National Association of Scholars. He has defended George W. Bush and neoconservative policies.  Berkowitz formerly served on the foreign policy advisory team in the Rudy Giuliani 2008 presidential campaign. Berkowitz is the Tad and Dianne Taube senior fellow at the Hoover Institution, Stanford University.

Trump administration 
On January 1, 2019, Berkowitz became the Director of Policy Planning in the Trump Administration.

In October 2020 he tested positive for coronavirus following meetings with senior officials at 10 Downing Street and the Foreign Office in London, and with officials in Budapest and Paris. Some U.S. State Department officials were angered by Berkowitz's trip, arguing that it was unnecessary.

Bibliography
 Nietzsche: The Ethics of an Immoralist (Harvard University Press, 1995).
 Virtue and the Making of Modern Liberalism (Princeton University Press, 1999).
 Never a Matter of Indifference: Sustaining Virtue in a Free Republic, editor (Hoover Institution Press, 2003).
 Varieties of Conservatism in America, editor (Hoover Institution Press, 2004).
 Varieties of Progressivism in America, editor (Hoover Institution Press, 2004)
 The Future of American Intelligence, editor (Hoover Institution Press, 2005)
 Terrorism, the Laws of War, and the Constitution: Debating the Enemy Combatant Cases, editor (Hoover Institution Press, 2005).
 Constitutional Conservatism: Liberty, Self-Government, and Political Moderation, (Hoover Institution Press, 2013).
Berkowitz has co-edited the Hoover Studies in Politics, Economics, and Society book series with Tod Lindberg since 2005.

References

External links
 
 

1959 births
American political scientists
American political writers
American male non-fiction writers
Harvard University faculty
Hebrew University of Jerusalem alumni
Hoover Institution people
Jewish American writers
Living people
Swarthmore College alumni
Yale Law School alumni